Karina Igorevna Istomina (born April 20, 1994) is a Russian DJ, blogger, podcaster, leading Instagram influencer, and ex-model.

Biography 
Karina Istomina was born in Moscow, Russia. She started her modelling career at the age of 15 and soon moved to New York City. She graduated from Higher School of Economics (Faculty of Media Communications) in 2016. She has also worked as a PR manager for Russian synthpop band Tesla Boy for a year.

As of 2021, Istomina is one of the most famous DJs in Moscow. She was the only Russian music blogger cooperating with Apple Music, for which she prepares exclusive playlists. In December 2019, Karina Istomina and Xenia Dukalis released the album Trendy Snakes (Podkomodnye zmei) in the genre of female alternative rap under the label ASC.

From 2019 to 2021 she was a co-host of the Girlfriends (Podrugi) show on the YouTube channel Gentle Editor (Nezhny redaktor) together with Tatiana Mingalimova, Xenia Dukalis and Tatiana Starikova, where they have been discussing feminism, self-esteem, bullying, sex and other topics with experts and guest stars.

In February 2021, Istomina started a new show on TikTok the Musical Thursday (Muzykal'ny chetverg). In April 2021, Istomina launched the YouTube project It's easier to Cope (Spravitsya proshe), dedicated to mental health problems.

In March 2022, Russia moved to block access to Instagram and thereby a major source of income for influencers including Istomina. She reacted saying, "To be honest with you, I am absolutely devastated that I am losing my page. I ran my profile for over 10 years. Most likely I will have to find new sources of income, will have to rediscover myself."

Personal life 
In 2021, Istomina publicly announced her drug addiction, craving for self-harm and mental problems.

Filmography 
 2021 — Happy End as a DJ (cameo)

Notes

1994 births
Living people
Female models from Moscow
Russian DJs
Russian YouTubers
Russian bloggers
Russian women bloggers
Mass media people from Moscow
Russian podcasters
Higher School of Economics alumni
Russian feminists
Musicians from Moscow
21st-century Russian women musicians
Russian women musicians
Russian video bloggers